Springdale Historic District may refer to:

Springdale Historic District (New Hope, Pennsylvania), listed on the National Register of Historic Places in Bucks County, Pennsylvania
Springdale Historic District (York, Pennsylvania), listed on the National Register of Historic Places in York County, Pennsylvania